Johnnetta Betsch Cole (born October 19, 1936) is an American anthropologist, educator, museum director, and college president. Cole was the first female African-American president of Spelman College, a historically black college, serving from 1987 to 1997. She was president of Bennett College from 2002 to 2007. During 2009–2017 she was Director of the Smithsonian Institution's National Museum of African Art.

Background
Johnnetta Betsch was born in Jacksonville, Florida, on October 19, 1936. Her family belonged to the African-American upper class; She was a granddaughter of Abraham Lincoln Lewis, Florida's first black millionaire, entrepreneur and cofounder of the Afro-American Industrial and Benefit Association, and Mary Kingsley Sammis. Sammis' great-grandparents were Zephaniah Kingsley, a white slave trader and slave owner, who purchased African slave Anna Madgigine Jai in 1806, when she was 13 years old and he was 43 years old. Within 5 years, the statutory rapist had impregnated her three times and she bore his children, George, born June 1807; Martha, born July 1809; and Mary, born February 1811. When she was 18, Zephaniah freed Anna and she herself became a slave owner, working with her former slave owner. Formerly a Wolof princess who was originally from present-day Senegal, her Fort George Island home is protected as Kingsley Plantation, a National Historic Landmark.

Cole enrolled at the age of 15 in Fisk University, a historically black college. She transferred to Oberlin College in Ohio, where she completed a Bachelor of Arts degree in sociology in 1957. She attended graduate school at Northwestern University, earning her Master of Arts (1959) and Doctor of Philosophy (1967) degrees in anthropology. She did her dissertation field research in Liberia, West Africa, in 1960–1961 through Northwestern University as part of their economic survey of the country.

Teaching
Cole served as a professor at Washington State University from 1962 to 1970, where she cofounded one of the US's first black studies programs. In 1970 Cole began working in the Department of Anthropology at the University of Massachusetts Amherst, where she served until 1982. While at the University of Massachusetts, she played a pivotal role in the development of the university's W. E. B. Du Bois Department of African-American Studies. Cole then moved to Hunter College in 1982, and became director of the Latin American and Caribbean Studies program. From 1998 to 2001 Cole was a professor of Anthropology, Women's Studies, and African American Studies at Emory University in Atlanta.

Administration
In 1987, Cole was selected as the first black female president of Spelman College, a prestigious historically black college for women. She served until 1997, building up their endowment through a $113 million capital campaign, attracting significantly higher enrollment as students increased, and, overall, the ranking of the school among the best liberal arts schools went up. Comedian Bill Cosby and his wife Camille contributed $20 million to the capital campaign.

After teaching at Emory University, she was recruited as president of Bennett College for Women, also a historically black college for women. There she led another successful capital campaign. In addition, she founded an art gallery to contribute to the college's culture. Cole is currently the Chair of the Johnnetta B. Cole Global Diversity & Inclusion Institute founded at Bennett College for Women. She is a member of Delta Sigma Theta sorority.

She was Director of the National Museum of African Art, part of the Smithsonian Institution in Washington, DC, during 2009–2017. During her directorship the controversial exhibit, "Conversations: African and African-American Artworks in Dialogue," featuring dozens of pieces from Bill and Camille Cosby's private art collection was held in 2015, coinciding with accusations of sexual assault against the comedian.

Service
Cole has also served in major corporations and foundations. Cole served for many years as board member at the prestigious Rockefeller Foundation. She has been a director of Merck & Co. since 1994. From 2004 to 2006, Cole was the Chair of the Board of Trustees of United Way of America and is on the Board of Directors of the United Way of Greater Greensboro. 

Since 2013, Cole has been listed on the Advisory Council of the National Center for Science Education. She is a member of The Links.

Political activity
President-elect Bill Clinton appointed Cole to his transition team for education, labor, the arts, and humanities in 1992. He also considered her for the cabinet post of Secretary of Education. However, when The Jewish Daily Forward reported that she had been a member of the national committee of the Venceremos Brigades, which the Federal Bureau of Investigation had tied to Cuban intelligence forces, Clinton did not advance her nomination.

Legacy and honors
 In 2018 she was awarded the Legend in Leadership Award for Higher Education from the Yale Chief Executive Leadership Institute 
 American Alliance of Museums Honors Dr. Johnnetta Cole with 2017 Award for Distinguished Service to Museums
 In 2013, Cole received the highest citation of the International Civil Rights Center & Museum, the Alston-Jones International Civil and Human Rights Award.
 Cole has received more than 40 honorary degrees, including those from Williams College and Bates College in 1989, Oberlin College in 1995, Mount Holyoke College in 1998, Mills College in 1999, Howard University and North Carolina A&T State University in 2009, and Gettysburg College in 2017.
 She received honorary membership in Phi Beta Kappa from Yale in 1996, and has served as a Phi Beta Kappa Senator.
 In 1995, Cole received the Golden Plate Award of the American Academy of Achievement presented by Awards Council member and Morehouse College President Walter E. Massey.
 She received a Candace Award from the National Coalition of 100 Black Women in 1988.

Quotes

References

External links 

2002 Voices from the Gaps
At 80, Johnnetta Cole reflects on her career and the controversial Cosby exhibition
1998 commencement speech, Mount Holyoke College
2009 State-of-the-College Address, Oberlin College
Johnnetta Cole: Groundbreaking Scholar & College President. Video produced by Makers: Women Who Make America

1936 births
20th-century American educators
20th-century American women educators
African-American museum directors
African-American social scientists
American people of Senegalese descent
American social scientists
American women anthropologists
Bennett College faculty
Delta Sigma Theta members
Directors of the National Museum of African Art
Fisk University alumni
Kingsley-Ndiaye family
Living people
Northwestern University alumni
Oberlin College alumni
Presidents of Spelman College
University of California, Los Angeles faculty
University of Massachusetts Amherst faculty
Women heads of universities and colleges
Women museum directors